Aethes cremonana is a species of moth of the family Tortricidae. It is found in Asia Minor, Lebanon, Syria and Iran.

References

Moths described in 1894
cremonana
Moths of Asia